Dean Brown (born November 16, 1945) is an American former professional football defensive back who played in the National Football League (NFL) for the Cleveland Browns and Miami Dolphins from 1969 to 1970. Brown played in a total of ten career games.

References

1945 births
Living people
People from McDonough, Georgia
Players of American football from Georgia (U.S. state)
Sportspeople from the Atlanta metropolitan area
American football defensive backs
Fort Valley State Wildcats football players
Cleveland Browns players
Miami Dolphins players